The 2012 Vuelta a Andalucía was the 58th edition of the Vuelta a Andalucía, a regional Spanish road bicycle race. It was rated as a 2.1 event and was the 13th race of the UCI Europe Tour. The race was held over 19–23 February.

Valverde's winning margin over runner-up Rein Taaramäe was three seconds, and 's Jérôme Coppel completed the podium, five seconds behind Taaramäe and eight seconds down on Valverde. In the race's other classifications, Valverde won the points and combination classifications,  rider Luis Ángel Maté won both the mountains and sprints classifications, and  finished at the head of the teams classification.

Teams
Sixteen teams participated in the 2012 Vuelta a Andalucía, consisting of seven UCI ProTour teams, eight UCI Professional Continental teams, and one UCI Continental Team.

UCI ProTour Teams

UCI Professional Continental Teams

UCI Continental Teams
Team NSP–Ghost

Stages

Prologue
19 February 2012 — San Fernando , Prologue (ITT)

Stage 1
20 February 2012 — Zahara de los Atunes to Benalmádena,

Stage 2
21 February 2012 — Málaga to Lucena,

Stage 3
22 February 2012 — Montemayor to Las Gabias,

Stage 4
23 February 2012 — Jaén to La Guardia de Jaén,

Classification leadership

References

External links

2012
2012 in Spanish road cycling
2012 UCI Europe Tour